Strempel is a surname. Notable people with the surname include:

 Eileen Strempel, American soprano, author etc.
 Erwin Strempel (1924–1999), German footballer
 Horst Strempel (1904–1975), German painter and graphic artist
 Shane Strempel (born 1969), Australian rules footballer